João Lobo Antunes (4 June 1944 – 27 October 2016) was a Portuguese neurosurgeon.

Life and career
João Lobo Antunes was born in Lisbon as the second of six sons of João Alfredo de Figueiredo Lobo Antunes (born 1915), prominent Neurologist and Professor, close collaborator of Egas Moniz, Nobel prize of physiology, and wife Margarida da Beira Cardoso de Melo Machado, daughter of Joaquim José Machado, 70th, 82nd and 91st Governor of Mozambique and 110th Governor of Portuguese India, and wife Mariana Cardoso de Melo. His great-grandfather in male line was an illegitimate son of Bernardo António de Brito Antunes, 1st Viscount of Nazaré. He is the brother of novelist António Lobo Antunes and Manuel Lobo Antunes.

He has a degree in medicine by the University of Lisbon (1968). He then went to the United States, and worked in the Department of Neurosurgery of the NewYork-Presbyterian Hospital and taught at the Columbia University. In 1983 he returned to Portugal, to get a PhD from the University of Lisbon. A year later he was Professor in Neurosurgery at the Faculty of Medicine.

In 1990, he was elected vice-president of the World Federation of Neurosurgical Societies; in 1999 he was elected the President of the European Neurosurgery Society.

In 1996, he was elected President of the Scientific Council of the Faculty of Medicine. In the same year, he received the prestigious Pessoa Award.

He is the author of more than 150 scientific articles and wrote 4 books: "A way to be" (Um Modo de Ser), "In a happy city" (Numa cidade feliz), "NY Memories and other essays" (Memória de Nova Iorque e outros ensaios) and "About the hand and other essays" (Sobre a mão e outros ensaios).

His research focused in the study of the hypothalamus and the hypophysis. In 1982/83 he was the first surgeon to implant an electronic device in the eye of a blind man.

He was Professor of Neurosurgery in the Faculty of Medicine of Lisbon, Director of the Department of Neurosurgery of the Saint Mary Hospital (Hospital de Santa Maria) in Lisbon and was the President of the Portuguese Academy of Medicine.

He died on 27 October 2016, in Lisbon, from melanoma, at the age of 72.

Marriages and children

He married firstly and divorced Ana Maria Plantier Couvreur de Oliveira (born 11 July 1944), daughter of Guilherme Couvreur de Oliveira (27 October 1914 - ?) and wife Maria do Carmo da Fonseca Plantier (born 1920), both of French descent, married secondly to Luís Vicente de Castro Guimarães, representative of the title of Count of Castro Guimarães with Coat of Arms (born Lisbon, 8 November 1932 and himself divorced from Maria Enrica Mandillo with three daughters), with one daughter, by whom he has three daughters: Margarida Lobo Antunes on 31 August 1970 (wife of Frederico de Matos e Noronha and mother of João (born 8 August 1996), twins Madalena and Pedro (born 13 February 1999) and Margarida (born 8 September 2006); Maria João Lobo Antunes in 1974 (married); and Paula Lobo Antunes in New York City, 20 January 1976, an actress with a degree in Medical Biology (married on 20 September 2003 and divorced Oliver Burns).

He married secondly in Cascais on 6 May 1983 and divorced Maria do Espírito Santo Silva Salgado (born Lisbon, Lapa, 8 June 1943), daughter of João Carlos Roma Machado Cardoso Salgado (1916 - ?), Economist and 954th Associate of the Second Tauromachic Club, and wife, married in Cascais, Maria da Conceição Cohen do Espírito Santo Silva (Lisbon, São Mamede, 21 December 1920 - Cascais, 28 December 2010), sister of Ricardo Salgado and widow of João Maria Coelho e Campos Poppe (Lisbon, Lapa, 11 June 1943 - Lisbon, 17 June 1982), whom she married in Cascais on 6 August 1965, with four children. He has, by this second marriage, one daughter: Madalena Sofia Salgado Lobo Antunes (born Cascais, 30 October 1984).

He married thirdly on 28 December 2002 Maria do Céu Lourinho Soares Machado (born Lisbon, Santos-o-Velho, 1 October 1949), daughter of Carlos Augusto Soares Machado (Sá da Bandeira, Angola, 27 November 1920 - Spain, 25 August 1984) and wife Maria da Conceição Cordeiro Lourinho (born Portalegre, São Lourenço) and sister of Genealogist José Carlos Lourinho Soares Machado, without issue.

References

1944 births
2016 deaths
Deaths from melanoma
Portuguese neurosurgeons
Pessoa Prize winners
People from Lisbon
University of Lisbon alumni
Academic staff of the University of Lisbon
20th-century Portuguese physicians
21st-century Portuguese physicians
20th-century surgeons